The 2009–10 season is the seventh in the history of the Scarlets regional side. The season will see the Scarlets compete in three competitions: the Celtic League, the Heineken Cup and the Anglo-Welsh Cup. The season will be their first full season at Parc y Scarlets.

Pre-season and friendlies

Celtic League

Anglo-Welsh Cup

Heineken Cup

European Challenge Cup

Statistics

Stats accurate as of match played 14 November 2009

Transfers

In

Out

References

2009-10
2009–10 Celtic League by team
2009–10 in Welsh rugby union
2009–10 Heineken Cup by team